Copenhagen Capacity is Greater Copenhagen's official organization for investment, promotion and business development. The organization was established in 1994 by Copenhagen Municipality, Frederiksberg Municipality, Copenhagen County, Frederiksborg County and Roskilde County, and works closely with "Invest in Denmark", the official investment promotion agency within the Ministry of Foreign Affairs of Denmark.

It operates as an independent organization financed by Capital Region of Denmark and Region Zealand. It offers business development services (market research, business set-up, business expansion) to foreign-owned companies free of charge and promises "full confidentiality".

References

External links  

Tourism in Denmark
Economy of Denmark